Lorentz Eldjarn (23 March 1920 – 11 February 2007) was a Norwegian biochemist and medical doctor.

He was born in Måsøy, but settled at Haslum. He studied medicine at the University of Oslo and was associated with the Norwegian Radium Hospital.

His thesis from 1954 treated metabolism of cystamine and cysteamine. He was a pioneer in the development of diagnostic methods and the use of clinical / chemical laboratories.

References

1920 births
2007 deaths
People from Måsøy
University of Oslo
Norwegian oncologists
Norwegian biochemists